Accidental Family is an American sitcom broadcast on NBC during the first part of the 1967-68 U.S. television season. The show ran for sixteen episodes, from September 15, 1967, to January 5, 1968.

The show aired on Fridays at 9:30pm, sandwiched between the non-sitcoms Star Trek before it, and documentaries after, which was not considered an auspicious timeslot. The program consistently lost in the Nielsen ratings to both the CBS Friday Night Movies and the ABC Western The Guns of Will Sonnett and was cancelled, midseason as a result. It was initially replaced by the first prime-time run of the game show Hollywood Squares.

Van Dyke publicly groused about the show's timeslot, complaining that nobody watched the show because of its competition. By October 13 — the airdate of the fourth episode — Van Dyke was already declaring defeat in the Arizona Daily Star. "In this business you've got to have such confidence," he said, "and I never did, so I'm beginning to wonder about myself. I'll tell you, I could use a success about now, and I believe this is a good show, but we've got to get out of that Friday night."

Synopsis
The series starred Jerry Van Dyke as a widowed comedian, Jerry Webster, who bought a farm in the San Fernando Valley to serve as a place for him to raise his son, Sandy, when he was not touring or working in Las Vegas.  When he was on the road, Sandy was under the care of the farm's manager, divorcée Sue Kramer (Lois Nettleton), who had a daughter the same age as Webster's son.

Reception
The Pasadena Star-News published a post-mortem about the show in November 1967, "Accidental Family: Cancellation Was No Accident", which praised the show and its potential, and laid the blame for cancellation on television networks' disinterest in producing high-quality programs. "Critics were quite favorable to the show in their first reviews," the piece claimed. "And the series deserved the praise. It had a low-key, slapstick humor; a touching but non-cloying evolvement of the father-son relationship; some clever, knowing conversations between the two adults, both in the same marital and parental boat; it had an almost hip quality." The piece also said, "It was different in several ways from the current crop of comedies — it didn't hang itself on a gimmick — no witches with twitches, no defrosted ancestors, no broadly slapstick broads-in-law. Just two kids, two parents, farm life contrasted with a touch of Las Vegas life, and the human, humorous situations thereof."

In April 1968, Jerry Van Dyke was a guest on Dick Van Dyke, a comedy/variety special hosted by his more famous brother. The special joked about the recent demise of Accidental Family; when Jerry asked Dick if he saw the show, Dick said, "No, I was out of town that week."

Cast

Episodes

References

Brooks, Tim and Marsh, Earle, The Complete Directory to Prime Time Network and Cable TV Shows

External links
 

1967 American television series debuts
1968 American television series endings
1960s American sitcoms
English-language television shows
NBC original programming
Television series by CBS Studios
Television shows set in Los Angeles